Abbottsfield is a neighbourhood in east Edmonton, Alberta, Canada overlooking the North Saskatchewan River valley. The neighbourhood is named for Abraham Abbott, a resident of the Town of Beverly and long time school custodian in the Beverly School District. While development of Abbottsfield didn't begin until nearly a decade after the amalgamation of Beverly with Edmonton in 1961, the neighbourhood is located in an area closely associated with Beverly. Beverly was a coal mining town, and one of the major Beverly coal mines was located in the Abbottsfield area.

Abbottsfield is bounded by the North Saskatchewan River valley on the east, 118 Avenue on the south, 34 Street on the west, and the Yellowhead Trail corridor on the north. Victoria Drive forms the boundary between the neighbourhood and river valley proper. Rundle Park is located in the river valley below Abbottsfield and the neighbourhood of Rundle Heights located immediately to the south.

Demographics 

Residential development 
As of 2016, the majority of dwellings are row houses, followed by apartments in low-rise apartment buildings. Approximately  of residences are rented.

Shopping and services 
Riverview Crossing (formerly known as Abbottsfield Shoppers Mall), a shopping centre, is located on the west edge of the neighbourhood on 118 Avenue, and is also the location of the Abbottsfield Transit Centre.

Abbottsfield Transit Centre 

The Abbottsfield Transit Centre is located near the Abbottsfield Mall on the west edge of the neighborhood. The transit centre is small compared to other transit centres in Edmonton and contains few amenities (no washrooms, park & ride, drop off areas, payphones, vending machines, etc...)

The following bus routes serve the transit centre: 8,101,102,116

Mining 
The Town of Beverly was a coal mining town with over twenty mines operating in the area during the town's history. The Cloverbar Mine was active in the area of Abbottsfield.

Surrounding neighbourhoods

See also 
 Edmonton Transit Service

References

Further reading 
Herzog, Lawrence, "Built on Coal, A History of Beverly, Edmonton's Working Class Town", Beverly Community Development Society, 2000, Edmonton, Alberta

External links 

 Abbotsfield Neighbourhood Profile

Neighbourhoods in Edmonton
Edmonton Transit Service transit centres